Dumitru Arabadji (born 17 January 1972) is a Moldavian professional football manager. Since July 2010 he is the head coach of Moldavian football club FC Dinamo-Auto Tiraspol.

References

External links
 Dumitru Arabadji at soccerway (as manager)

1972 births
Living people
Moldovan football managers
People from Tiraspol
Moldovan Super Liga managers
FC Dinamo-Auto Tiraspol managers